Macrococcus canis is a Gram-positive bacterium from the genus of Macrococcus which has been isolated from the nose of a dog which had mucopurulent rhinitis in Switzerland.

References

External links
Type strain of Macrococcus canis at BacDive -  the Bacterial Diversity Metadatabase

 

Bacteria described in 2017
Staphylococcaceae